Gerzog Edinburgski was an armoured cruiser of the  built for the Imperial Russian Navy.

Gerzog Edinburgski was originally to be named Alexander Nevski but was renamed before launching. She was launched in 1875 and served in the Far East from 1879 to 1884 and in the Mediterranean Sea from 1897 until ca. 1900. While in the Mediterranean, she deployed to Crete to serve in the International Squadron, a multinational force made up of ships of the Austro-Hungarian Navy, French Navy, Imperial German Navy, Italian Royal Navy (Regia Marina), Imperial Russian Navy, and Royal Navy that intervened in the 1897-1898 Greek uprising on Crete against rule by the Ottoman Empire. She took part in the squadron's final operations when, as flagship of the commander of the squadron's Russian forces, Rear Admiral Nikolai Skrydlov, she departed Crete along with the British battleship  (flagship of the commander of British forces in the squadron, Rear-Admiral Gerard Noel) and the Italian battleship Francesco Morosini (flagship of the admiral commanding the squadron's Italian ships) in steaming to Milos with the French protected cruiser Bugeaud, flagship of the International Squadron's overall commander, Rear Admiral Édouard Pottier. At Milos, they rendezvoused with Prince George of Greece and Denmark aboard his yacht. After Prince George boarded Bugeaud on 20 December, Gerzog Edinburgski, Francesco Morosini, and Revenge escorted Bugeaud to Crete, where Prince George disembarked on 21 December 1898 to take office as the High Commissioner of an autonomous Cretan State under the suzerainty of the Ottoman Empire, bringing the Cretan uprising to an end. The International Squadron then dissolved.

Gerzog Edinburgski was used as a training vessel beginning in the early 1900s. She visited Plymouth in September 1902, and was in Brest the following month.  She was converted to a second-line minelayer in 1908. The ship could carry 600 mines and was renamed Onega. She was hulked in 1915 as a depot ship and renamed  № 4, Barrikada \ «Баррикада», № 9) after the Bolshevik Revolution. She was broken up in 1949.

References

Citations

Bibliography

 Clowes, Sir William Laird. The Royal Navy: A History From the Earliest Times to the Death of Queen Victoria, Volume Seven. London: Chatham Publishing, 1997. .  
 McTiernan, Mick, A Very Bad Place Indeed For a Soldier. The British involvement in the early stages of the European Intervention in Crete. 1897 - 1898, King's College, London, September 2014.

External links
 page in English

General-Admiral-class cruisers
1875 ships
Naval ships of Russia
Cruisers of the Imperial Russian Navy
Ships built at the Baltic Shipyard